Santasi is suburb of Kumasi.   Kumasi is the regional capital of the Ashanti Region of Ghana.  It is both a residential and industrial area in the Kumasi Metropolitan Assembly. It is about 6kilometres westwards from centre of the regional capital.

Notable place
The Opoku Ware School,  a boys second cycle institution is in the town. The school is a mission school under the Ghana Catholic Secretariat.

Saint Hubert is another all boys second cycle institution situated in the town.

References

Populated places in Kumasi Metropolitan Assembly